Edmondsham House is a Tudor home with Georgian additions in Edmondsham near Wimborne Minster in Dorset, England. It is a Grade II* listed building.

History 
The house was finished in 1598 for Thomas Hussey; but started by Roger Hussey married to Elizabeth Tregonwell in 1589 the stonework done by the Arnold family of 3 plus builders, and used locally-made bricks to create a striking Dutch-style residence.

The House Garden and Park are open to the public "..by prior appointment.." as also nominated days (pre FA98 regime) www.edmondshamhouse.com. 

A nursery exists on the wider estate.

Entrances

Exterior views

References 

Houses completed in 1598
Country houses in Dorset
Grade II* listed buildings in Dorset
Georgian architecture in England
Tudor architecture